Vibart is both a surname and a given name. Notable people with the name include:
 Henry Vibart (1863–1939), Scottish actor
 Vibart Wight (1902–1969), Guyanese cricketer
 Edward Vibart (1807–1857), British Soldier, murdered by Sepoys at Siege of Cawnpore
 Edward Daniel Hamilton Vibart (1837–1923), son of the above, soldier and writer